Khanyisile Litchfield-Tshabalala is a former South African Navy admiral. She later became a Member of Parliament for the Economic Freedom Fighters.

Early life and education
She was born in Soweto and later joined Umkhonto we Sizwe in exile in Angola. On her return to South Africa she completed a politics and drama degree at the University of Cape Town and an honours degree in criminology.

Naval career
She joined the South African Navy on 1 April 1997 and became the first woman to be promoted to the rank of Rear Admiral (Junior Grade) when she assumed the post of Director Fleet Force Human Resources at Fleet Command on 1 January 2004. She later resigned after she was convicted by a military court for fraudulently reporting the theft of a laptop. The missing laptop was never found and she denied fabricating the theft.

Political career 
She entered parliament as a member of the EFF following the 2014 general election.

On 3 June 2015 she joined the United Democratic Movement (UDM), and was immediately tasked as a party National Organiser. In December 2015, she was elected deputy president of the UDM. In late September 2016, she left the UDM, citing her desire to pursue further education, however commentators claim that she fell out with Holomisa.

References

Economic Freedom Fighters politicians
Living people
People from Soweto
South African admirals
University of Cape Town alumni
Year of birth missing (living people)
21st-century South African politicians
21st-century South African women politicians